Bermuda competed at the 1984 Summer Olympics in Los Angeles, United States.  The nation returned to the Summer Games after participating in the American-led boycott of the 1980 Summer Olympics. Twelve competitors, eleven men and one woman, took part in ten events in five sports.

Athletics

Men
Track & road events

Field events

Women
Field events

Cycling

Three cyclists represented Bermuda in 1984.

Road

Equestrian

Eventing

Sailing

Alan Burland and Christopher Nash in Tornado Class, finished in 5th place, narrowly missing out on a medal
Men

Open

Swimming

Men

References

External links
Official Olympic Reports

Nations at the 1984 Summer Olympics
1984
1984 in Bermudian sport